Rosedale is a farming-based community located east of Chilliwack, British Columbia. This small community is based alongside the Fraser River. It serves as a base for many tourists, both in summer and winter. The hills and valleys of British Columbia are popular skiing, snowboarding and dogsledding locations. In summer, rockclimbing and whitewater rafting are the primary activities in the Fraser Valley.

In  the 2007 school year, the middle school located in Rosedale, Rosedale Middle School, was transformed into the Chilliwack School District's first traditional school. Rosedale now boasts an elementary/middle school combined, which opened its doors in 2012.

Climate

References

External links
Homes For Sale
Rosedale Hiking Trails
Rosedale Website at Travel.bc.ca
Rosedale Roadhouse

Neighbourhoods in Chilliwack
Populated places on the Fraser River